The 1968 Bulgarian Cup Final was the 28th final of the Bulgarian Cup (in this period the tournament was named Cup of the Soviet Army), and was contested between Spartak Sofia and Beroe Stara Zagora on 6 June 1968 at Vasil Levski National Stadium in Sofia. Spartak won the final 3–2 after extra time, claiming their first ever Bulgarian Cup title.

Match

Details

See also
1967–68 A Group

References

Bulgarian Cup finals
Cup Final